Hussein Ali Thajil  (born 1 July 1958) is an Iraqi former football midfielder who played for Iraq in the 1978 Asian Games.

Hesham played for the national team in 1978.

References

Iraqi footballers
Iraq international footballers
Living people
Footballers at the 1978 Asian Games
1958 births
Asian Games competitors for Iraq
Association football midfielders